Jean de la Trémoille (d. 1449), seigneur of Jonvelle, was Grand Master and Grand Chamberlain to the dukes of Burgundy John the Fearless and Philip the Good.  He was the son of Guy and Marie de Sully, Princess of Boisbelle and Countess of Guînes. On 17 July 1424 he married Jacqueline d'Amboise, daughter of Ingerger II and Jeanne de Craon. 

He bore the titles :
 de la Trémoïlle, or de la Trémouille
 seigneur de Jonvelle
 seigneur of Beaumont
 seigneur of Saint-Loup
 seigneur of Conflans-Sainte-Honorine
 seigneur of Saint-Just
 seigneur of Sainte Hermine
 seigneur of Sully
 seigneur of Saint-Gaudon
 seigneur of Courcelles
 seigneur of Antilly
 seigneur of Bauché
 seigneur of Amboise
 seigneur of Montrichard
 seigneur of Bléré
 baron of Dracy
 knight of the Order of the Golden Fleece from 1430.

1449 deaths
Tremoille
Burgundian knights
Duchy of Burgundy
15th-century French people